Only Just Beginning is the fourth album by Jason Webley, released in 2004.

Track listing
"February Relaxing Her Fingers After a Brief Winter's Grip" – 4:18
"Music That Puts Everything Together" – 4:54
"Balloon Feather Boat Tomato" – 5:11
"Icarus" – 3:55
"Mine" – 3:38
"Map" – 4:38
"Viaje" – 4:01
"May Day" – 3:20
"With" – 7:50
"Coda" – 10:10

Personnel
Jason Webley – vocals, guitar, accordion, piano, etc.
Michael McQuilken – percussion
Jherek Bischoff – bass
Seth Warren – violin
Liz Sprout Guy – viola
Taryn Webber – cello
Brant Campbell – clarinet, alto saxophone
Fred Hawkinson – trombone
Gary Luke – tuba

References
 Jason Webley – Only Just Beginning

Jason Webley albums
2004 albums